William George (and variants) may refer to:

Sports

American football
William George (American football), 1889 College Football All-America selection
Bill George (American football coach) (active since 1976), American football coach in the United States
Bill George (linebacker) (1929–1982), American football linebacker for the Chicago Bears and Los Angeles Rams

Other sports
Bill George (baseball) (1865–1916), American baseball player
Billy George (footballer, born 1874) (1874–1933), English footballer and cricketer
Billy George (footballer, born 1895) (1895–1962), English footballer
Billy George (gymnast) (born 1991), British gymnast
W. B. George (1899–1972), president of the Canadian Amateur Hockey Association

Others
Bill George (businessman) (born 1951), American businessman and academic
Bill George (dog dealer) (1802–1881), British dog dealer and celebrity
Bill George (labor activist) (active since 1960), American labor leader
Bill George (visual effects supervisor) (active since 1979), Academy Award winning visual effects supervisor
William George (priest) (died 1756), English academic and Anglican churchman
William James George (1853–1931), Australian politician
William K. George (born 1945), American fluid dynamicist
W. R. P. George (William Richard Philip George, 1912–2006), Welsh solicitor and poet

See also